Telos refers to the philosophical concept of purpose. Telos may also refer to:

Companies
 Telos (company), a defense contractor and software business in Ashburn, Virginia
 The Telos Alliance, a manufacturer of equipment for broadcasting stations
 Telos Publishing, a publishing company that deals primarily in horror/fantasy and unofficial program guides

Computer science
 TELOS, acronym for The EuLisp Object System
 Telos, name of a knowledge representation language used in ConceptBase

In fiction
 Telos (Doctor Who), a planet in the television series Doctor Who
 T-elos, an antagonist in the video game series Xenosaga
 Telos is a planet and a character in the DC Comics series Convergence (comics)
 Telos, a boss monster in the MMORPG RuneScape
 A planet in Star Wars appearing in the video game Knights of the Old Republic II: The Sith Lords and the novel The Day of Reckoning

Other uses
 Telos Lake, in Maine
 Tilos (ancient Greek: Telos), a Greek island in the Dodecanese
 Telos (journal), a journal of politics, philosophy, and critical theory, and its accompanying publishing company, Telos Press
 TELOS (project management), an acronym used in Project Management regarding feasibility studies
 Telos (album), a 2014 album by the American band Forevermore
 "Telos", a song from the album The Parallax II: Future Sequence by American progressive metal band Between The Buried and Me

See also
 Tellos, a fantasy comic book series
 Tellos Agras, the nom de guerre of Greek officer Sarantis-Tellos Agapinos (c. 1880–1907)
 Telo (disambiguation)